Floyd L. Huggins (April 18, 1928 – March 26, 2011) was an American football player and coach.

Following a career at the University of Florida and service in the Korean War, Huggins spent one season playing for the Winnipeg Blue Bombers of the Canadian Football League.

He served as the head football coach at Pratt Community College in Pratt, Kansas from 1960 to 1962. He next served as head coach of the 1963 Hardin–Simmons Cowboys football team at Abilene, Texas.

Head coaching record

College

References

1928 births
2011 deaths
American football fullbacks
American players of Canadian football
Florida Gators football players
Fort Scott Greyhounds football players
Hardin–Simmons Cowboys football coaches
Winnipeg Blue Bombers players
Junior college football coaches in the United States